There are a few places named Cross Plains in the United States:

Cross Plains, Alabama
Cross Plains, Indiana
Cross Plains, Kentucky 
Cross Plains, Tennessee
Cross Plains, Texas
Cross Plains (town), Wisconsin, partially containing the village of Cross Plains
Cross Plains, Wisconsin, a village
Cross Plains Township, South Dakota